This is a list of settlements in Laconia, Greece.

 Afisi
 Agia Eirini
 Agioi Anargyroi
 Agioi Apostoloi
 Agios Dimitrios, Evrotas
 Agios Dimitrios, Monemvasia
 Agios Georgios
 Agios Ioannis, Evrotas
 Agios Ioannis, Monemvasia
 Agios Ioannis, Sparti
 Agios Konstantinos
 Agios Nikolaos, East Mani
 Agios Nikolaos, Monemvasia
 Agios Nikolaos, Voies
 Agios Vasileios
 Agoriani
 Agrianoi
 Aigies
Akrogiali
 Alepochori
 Alevrou
 Alika
 Amykles
 Anavryti
 Angelona
 Ano Boularioi
 Ano Kastania
 Anogeia
 Apidea
 Archangelos, Laconia
 Archontiko
 Areopoli
 Arna
 Asopos
 Asteri
 Charakas
 Charria (Harria)
 Chosiari
 Chrysafa
 Dafni
 Dafnio
 Daimonia
 Drosopigi
 Dryalos
 Drymos
 Elafonisos
 Elaia
 Elika
 Elliniko
 Elos
 Exo Nymfi
 Faraklo
 Foiniki
 Georgitsi
 Geraki
 Germa
 Gerolimenas
 Gkoritsa
 Glykovrysi
 Goranoi
 Gouves
 Grammousa
 Gytheio
 Ierakas
 Kallithea
 Kalloni
 Kalogonia
 Kalyvia Sochas
 Kalyvia
 Kampos
 Karea
 Karitsa
 Karvelas
 Karyes
 Karyoupoli
 Kastania
 Kastania, Monemvasia
 Kastoreio
 Kefalas
 Kelefa
 Kladas
 Koita
 Kokkala
 Kokkina Louria
 Konakia
 Koniditsa
 Kotronas
 Kounos
 Koupia
 Kremasti
 Krini
 Krokees
 Kryoneri
 Kyparissi
 Lachi
 Lagi
 Lagia
 Lampokampos
 Lefkochoma
 Leimonas
 Lira
 Longanikos
 Longastra
 Lygereas
 Magoula
 Marathea
 Melissa
 Melitini
 Mesochori
 Metamorfosi
 Mina
 Molaoi
 Monemvasia
 Myrsini
 Myrtia
 Mystras
 Neapoli
 Neo Oitylo
 Neochori
 Niata
 Nomia
 Oitylo
 Pakia
 Palaiopanagia
 Palaiovrysi
 Pantanassa, Laconia
 Papadianika
 Paroreio
 Pellana
 Peristeri
 Perivolia
 Petrina
 Pistamata
 Platana
 Platanos
 Polovitsa
 Potamia
 Prosili
 Psōïnianika
 Pyrgos Dirou
 Pyrrichos
 Reichea
 Riviotissa
 Selegoudi
 Sellasia
 Sidirokastro
 Skala
 Skamnaki
 Skoura
 Skoutari
 Soustianoi
 Sparti
 Spartia
 Stefania
 Sykia
 Talanta
 Theologos
 Trapezanti
 Trypi
 Tsikkalia
 Vachos
 Vamvakou
 Varvitsa
 Vasaras
 Vasilaki
 Vasiliki
 Vatheia
 Velanidia
 Velies
 Vlachiotis
 Vordonia
 Voutianoi
 Vresthena
 Vrontamas
 Xirokampi

By municipality

Elafonisos (no subdivisions)

See also
List of towns and villages in Greece

 
Laconia